Grampian Transport Museum is a transport museum and charitable-based trust located in Alford, Aberdeenshire, Scotland. Its exhibits chart the history of transport in the north east of Scotland through dramatic displays, working and climb-aboard vehicle exhibits and video presentations.

History
The museum was formed after a group of local transport enthusiasts and collectors in the early 1970s sought to develop a local transport museum. In 1978, the group held a public meeting at which, after an offer was made to lease the former goods yard to the north of the former Alford railway station, the Grampian Transport Museum Association was formed. A pilot museum was established in a local factory in 1981, and after the first annual Alford Cavalcade vintage vehicle rally held during July, a combination of local councils offered grants and subsidies to establish a permanent exhibition base. Construction work on the current building was completed in September 1982, and the museum opened in April 1983. An extension was completed in 1998, landscaping and a track added in the early 2000s, and a second building, the Collections Centre, to house larger exhibits in the 2010s.  In 2016, the museum completed a new reception extension to improve the frontage of the museum and provide a warm welcome to its visitors.

One of Aberdeen's hydrogen buses was gifted to the museum in 2020. The museum plans to create a new outdoor exhibition which will include the bus.

Exhibition
Major exhibits include the world's oldest Sentinel Steam Waggon from 1914, a giant Mack Snowplow and a working model of Robert Davidson's motor for electric traction. Exhibits include historic and classic automobiles, motorcycles, a double-decker bus, bicycles, steam vehicles, an electric tram, toy model vehicles, and transport memorabilia.

See also
Alford Valley Railway - located on an adjacent site

References

External links

Official Website

Museums in Aberdeenshire
Transport museums in Scotland
Automobile museums in Scotland
Grampian